The 2002 European Winter Throwing Challenge was held on 9 and 10 March at Stadion Veruda in Pula, Croatia. It was the second edition of the athletics competition for throwing events organised by the European Athletics Association. A total of 175 athletes from 26 countries entered the competition, an increase on the inaugural edition the previous year.

The competition featured men's and women's contests in shot put, discus throw, javelin throw and hammer throw. Athletes were seeded into "A" and "B" groups in several events due to the number of entries. Rutger Smith of the Netherlands defied his seeding in both the shot put and discus, managing to reach the overall podium in the events despite being in the weaker "B" group.

Medal summary

Men

Women

Medal and points table

Participation
Bosnia and Herzegovina and the Republic of Macedonia entered several athletes, but none attended the competition. San Marino entered one athlete (Gabriele Mazza), but he did not compete.

References

Results
2nd European Winter Throwing Challenge Results. RFEA. Retrieved on 2013-11-16.
Euro Chall  Pula  CRO  9 - 10 March. Tilastopaja. Retrieved on 2013-11-16.

European Throwing Cup
European Cup Winter Throwing
International athletics competitions hosted by Croatia
2002 in European sport
European Cup Winter Throwing
Sport in Pula